Leccinum rufum is a species of fungus in the genus Leccinum.

External links
 

rufum
Fungi of Europe
Edible fungi